A hammercloth is a large decorative piece of heavy weatherproof fabric, often fringed and richly adorned with embroidery, gemstones, and cloth of gold, placed over and around the seat of the coachman of a state or family horse and carriage.  A hammercloth might display the arms or other emblems of the heritage of the owner of the coach.

Origin
The origin of the word hammercloth is uncertain, and several etymologies have been given.  One is that a coachman used to carry his tools, including a hammer, with him underneath his seat to perform repairs to a carriage should it break down on the road.  Another is that the "hammer" portion is a corruption of the word "hamper", and meant to suggest that the cloth covered a hamper which might contain food for the passengers or coachman.  A third is that it is a corruption of "hammock", and that a "hammock-cloth" was a strip of fabric used instead of a wooden seat in days before carriages had springs for shock absorption.  On a carriage with no springs, a hammock provides a much more comfortable ride than a wooden slat, and so "hammock-cloth" may have been the original term.

References

 Carriages